Lyle James Alfred Taylor (born 29 March 1990) is a professional footballer who plays as a striker for  club Nottingham Forest and for the Montserrat national team. Born in Greenwich, England, he internationally represents Montserrat.

Prior to joining the football club of Nottingham Forest, he played for AFC Wimbledon, and became the Dons' record Football League goal scorer with 44 goals, and highest scorer during their Football League era with 55 goals in all competitions.

Taylor started his senior club career with Millwall before spells with Concord Rangers, AFC Bournemouth, Falkirk, Sheffield United, and Scunthorpe United. He has also spent time on loan at Eastbourne Borough, Croydon Athletic, Lewes, Hereford United, Woking, two spells at Partick Thistle, and Birmingham City.

Club career

Millwall
Taylor was spotted by Millwall whilst playing for Staines Town youth academy, and progressed from the Millwall U18's to the reserve team. In October 2008 he signed a one-month loan deal at Conference National side Eastbourne Borough in order to gain first team experience. In November 2008 his loan was extended by another month. Although he played five games, he had only scored one goal, against Stevenage Borough. Eastbourne Borough coach Nick Greenwood decided to end the loan deal, stating Taylor was not ready for Conference starts, as he was still learning his trade.

Concord Rangers and AFC Bournemouth
Taylor's contract at Millwall expired on 1 July 2009, after which he signed for Concord Rangers. After scoring 34 goals in his first season for Rangers, Taylor was offered a trial with AFC Bournemouth, and subsequently agreed a two-year deal with the south-coast club. He made his Football League debut the following day, in a 3–3 draw against Notts County. However, Taylor struggled to hold down a regular first-team place and appeared to be surplus to requirements.

On 31 January 2011, Taylor signed a one-month loan deal with Isthmian League side Lewes, a deal which was extended the following month. On 7 February 2011, Taylor scored on his Lewes debut, in a 2–2 draw against Boreham Wood. Despite his initial success, in March 2011, Taylor refused to extend his stay at Lewes any further, describing it as a "big risk". Despite public support from assistant manager Steve Fletcher who insisted he had a future at the club, Taylor failed to break into the Bournemouth team. Taylor then joined Woking at the end of March, agreeing a loan deal until the end of the season.

At the start of the 2011–12 season, and following promising performances in pre-season, Taylor scored a brace against Dagenham & Redbridge in the first round of the League Cup. Still unable to force his way into the Bournemouth first–team, in February 2012 Taylor was allowed to leave on loan once more, agreeing a one-month deal with Hereford United. He scored twice in eight appearances for Hereford before returning to his parent club at the end of his loan spell. Taylor was released by Bournemouth at the end of the season having netted just two cup goals in the two years he was at the club.

Falkirk
In July 2012, Taylor signed for Scottish side Falkirk, scoring twice on his competitive debut in the Scottish Challenge Cup, in a 3–0 win over Stirling Albion. Taylor also scored on his league debut in a 3–1 defeat against Partick Thistle on 11 August 2012. After a successful season, Taylor attracted interest from elsewhere, with Falkirk accepting an offer from English League One side Rotherham United, only for Taylor to reject the move as he could not agree personal terms with the club.

Sheffield United

Following the collapse of Taylor's proposed move to Rotherham United, Falkirk accepted another offer, this time from Sheffield United and Taylor duly signed a two-year deal for an undisclosed fee. Taylor made his debut for the Blades in the opening fixture of the following season, coming on as a second-half substitute in a 2–1 home victory over Notts County. Unable to hold down a regular place in the side Taylor did not score for his new employers until mid-October when he netted a brace against Coventry City.

With the arrival of new manager Nigel Clough at United however, Taylor continued to find his first team chances limited and was eventually allowed to join Scottish Premiership side Partick Thistle on loan until the end of the season. Having made his debut for Partick in a 1–0 away loss to Celtic, Taylor netted his first goal for the Jags in his second game a 2–0 away win against Hearts a few days later. Taylor played 20 games for Partick in total that season, scoring seven goals, before returning to England in the summer.

Scunthorpe United
With first-team opportunities apparently limited at Sheffield United, Taylor joined Scunthorpe United for an undisclosed fee on 30 June 2014. Taylor made his United debut on 9 August 2014, in a 3–1 defeat against Swindon Town. He made his home debut on 16 August, in a 0–4 defeat against Preston North End. He scored his first goal for the club on 16 September 2014, in a 2–1 win against Coventry City. He scored his second goal for the club in a 2–2 draw against Port Vale on 21 October. He played 12 times for United in the league that season, scoring three goals as they finished 16th.

On 2 February 2015, Taylor returned to Partick Thistle for a second loan spell. He scored in his first game back at the club, on 7 February 2015, in a 2–1 defeat against Inverness CT in the Scottish Cup. He scored his first league goal in a 3–1 home defeat against Ross County. Taylor then scored twice in a 2–0 home win over Motherwell on 11 April 2015.

AFC Wimbledon
On 14 July 2015, 25-year-old Taylor signed with AFC Wimbledon for an undisclosed sum. On 1 September, he scored his first goal for the club in a 3–2 loss to Plymouth Argyle in the Football League Trophy. Taylor scored his first league goal in a 2–0 win over Barnet on 3 October 2015 and scored a double in a 4–3 away win at Accrington. He continued to score freely as the Dons finished 7th in League Two, ensuring a spot in the play-offs. He played in both semi-final legs of the 3–2 aggregate win against Accrington Stanley, scoring the equaliser in extra-time in the second leg which sent the Dons to Wembley. He scored the opening goal in AFC Wimbledon's 2–0 win over Plymouth Argyle in the 2015–16 League Two play-off final, plundering 23 goals and seven assists in all competitions in his first season for the club, as the Dons gained promotion to League One.

On 30 August 2016, Taylor signed an extended deal with the club. Taylor notched 14 goals and six assists in all competitions in his second season for the club as AFC Wimbledon finished safely in 15th in its debut season in League One in 2016–17.

Taylor followed this up in the 2017–18 season by reaching Jack Midson's Football League goals record for the club, 38, when scoring vs Gillingham in a 2–2 draw on 30 December 2017, and broke the record when scoring a brace vs Plymouth in a 4–2 loss on 13 February 2018. These goals were also his 50th and 51st for the club. Taylor scored 18 goals and eight assists in all competitions in his third season for the club as AFC Wimbledon battled relegation by finishing in 18th in its second season in League One in 2017–18.

Taylor is AFC Wimbledon's record Football League goal scorer with 44 goals, and the Dons highest scorer during their Football League era with 55 goals in all competitions.

During his time at AFC Wimbledon, Taylor was given the nickname "The Montserratian Messi" by author and AFC Wimbledon fan John Green, on Dear Hank & John, the weekly podcast he co-hosts.

Charlton Athletic
Taylor signed for AFC Wimbledon's League One rivals Charlton Athletic on 27 June 2018 on a two year deal.

In April 2019, Taylor was the victim of racist abuse on Twitter from an apparent Bradford City fan following the clubs' recent match. Bradford City said they would investigate the matter.

On 1 June 2020, Charlton manager Lee Bowyer confirmed Taylor had refused to sign short term extension with the club to see out the rest of the 2019–20 EFL Championship season, he also refused to see out his existing contract for the next three matches for Charlton Athletic. Following the suspension of the season due to the COVID-19 pandemic in the United Kingdom, as he did not want to risk injury. On 2 July 2020, it was confirmed that Taylor had left Charlton after his contract expired.

Nottingham Forest
On 15 August 2020, Taylor joined Championship club Nottingham Forest on a free transfer. He signed a contract of undisclosed length. Taylor made his first Forest start in a 1-0 defeat to Huddersfield Town on 25 September 2020. He scored his first goal for Forest in a 1-1 draw with rivals Derby County on 23 October 2020.

On 27 January 2022, Taylor joined Birmingham City on loan for the rest of the 2021-22 season. He scored against Derby County on his debut for the club, and finished his loan spell with five goals from 14 appearances.

International career
In March 2015, Taylor was called up to play for Montserrat in their qualification matches for the 2018 FIFA World Cup, being eligible through his grandparents. He made his full International début against Curaçao on 27 March 2015, scoring his first international goal.

Personal life
Born in Greenwich, England, United Kingdom. His brother, Cray Wanderers defender Joey Taylor, also plays for the Montserrat national football team.

Taylor has also worked as a model and appeared in TV advertisements for the Champions League.

In October 2018 he dyed his hair pink and wore pink boots, to raise money for Cancer Research UK.

Taylor has refused to follow the EFL initiative to take the knee before football matches. In an interview, Taylor described Black Lives Matter as a 'Marxist group' that 'are using racial unrest to push their own political agenda'.

Career statistics

Club

International

Scores and results list Montserrat's goal tally first, score column indicates score after each Taylor goal.

Honours
AFC Wimbledon
Football League Two play-offs: 2016

Charlton Athletic
EFL League One play-offs: 2019

Nottingham Forest
EFL Championship play-offs: 2022

Individual
Charlton Athletic Player of the Year: 2018–19

References

External links

Profile at the Nottingham Forest F.C. website

1990 births
Living people
Footballers from Greenwich
English footballers
Association football forwards
Millwall F.C. players
Eastbourne Borough F.C. players
Croydon Athletic F.C. players
Concord Rangers F.C. players
AFC Bournemouth players
Lewes F.C. players
Hereford United F.C. players
Woking F.C. players
Falkirk F.C. players
Sheffield United F.C. players
Partick Thistle F.C. players
Scunthorpe United F.C. players
AFC Wimbledon players
Charlton Athletic F.C. players
Nottingham Forest F.C. players
Birmingham City F.C. players
English Football League players
Isthmian League players
National League (English football) players
Scottish Football League players
Scottish Professional Football League players
Montserratian footballers
Montserrat international footballers
English people of Montserratian descent
British people of Montserratian descent